Delacău is a commune and village in the Anenii Noi District of Moldova.

Notable people
 Veaceslav Negruță

References

Communes of Anenii Noi District
Populated places on the Dniester